Jim Shackleton (4 April 1940 - 14 September 2022) was a Scotland international rugby union player. He normally played at Centre.

Rugby Union career

Amateur career

Born in India, after the Second World War he arrived in Scotland with his returning parents, and Shackleton went to Fettes College.

Shackleton then played for London Scottish.

He was part of the London Scottish side that won the Middlesex Sevens five times in the 1960s.

Provincial career

He played for Blues Trial on 9 February 1963.

He played for Scotland Possibles on 28 December 1963.

International career

Shackleton played for Scotland Schools.

He went on to receive 7 senior caps for Scotland. He scored a try in his last match, the 1965 game against South Africa, in a 8- 5 win for Scotland.

Business career

He was a consultant in the building trade with the construction company Higgs and Hill.

References

1940 births
2022 deaths
Scottish rugby union players
Scotland international rugby union players
London Scottish F.C. players
Blues Trial players
Scotland Possibles players